Elias Demetriou (Greek: Ηλίας Δημητρίου) is a Greek - Cypriot filmmaker known for his films Smac, Fish n' Chips, and Coat Fitting.

References

Sources
 Fish n' chips film review, The Hollywood Reporter
 Fish n' chips sails on by Flix
 Fish n' chips mini review by Now/here
 Elias Demetriou at Festival Scope
 Elias Demetriou at Altcine
 Elias Demetriou at Filmfestivals.com
 Elias Demetriou in Cypriot cinemas
 The rough Guide to Cyprus
 Elias Demetriou on Cineuropa 
 Elias Demetriou at Harringay Online

External links
 
 
 Elias Demetriou at the Greek Film Centre's site

Cypriot film directors
Cypriot film producers
Greek film editors
Living people
Place of birth missing (living people)
Cypriot screenwriters
Year of birth missing (living people)